The Minister for the Lands Freed by the Enemy was a short-lived office in the government of the Kingdom of Italy responsible for the lands conquered against Austria-Hungary during and after World War I. It was suppressed on 1 March 1923.

List of Ministers
 Parties

Coalitions

References

Lands
1923 disestablishments in Italy
Ministries established in 1919
1919 establishments in Italy